Marj al-Saffar or Marj al-Suffar is a large plain to the south of Damascus. Marj al-Saffar is bounded to the north by the right bank of the al-A'waj river, which flows from Mount Hermon to the Sabkhat al-Hijana. In the south the plain is bounded by the lava field of the Lajat (the largest, geologically recent lava-field in the south of Syria, roughly situated between Umm al-Qusur and Ghabaghib mountain). In the south-east, it is disputed whether the volcanic area of the al-Safa or the village of Jubb al-Safa that marks the boundary of the plain. Marj al-Saffar is bounded to the west by the village of Kanakir and in the north-west by the lava flow of Zakiyah. The railway line from Damascus to Daraa bounds Marj al-Saffar to the east.

Military history
Because of its good water supply and excellent grazing Marj al-Saffar was a staging area for armies and an area in which many battles was fought. For list of battles see Battle of Marj al-Saffar.

Bibliography
 

Plains of Syria
Rif Dimashq Governorate